Partitioning defective 3 homolog is a protein that in humans is encoded by the PARD3 gene.

Function 

PARD proteins, which were first identified in C. elegans, are essential for asymmetric cell division and polarized growth, whereas CDC42 (MIM 116952) mediates the establishment of cell polarity. The CDC42 GTPase, which is controlled by nucleotide exchange factors (GEFs; see MIM 606057) and GTPase-activating proteins (GAPs; see MIM 604980), interacts with a large set of effector proteins that typically contain a CDC42/RAC (MIM 602048)-interactive binding (CRIB) domain.[supplied by OMIM]

Interactions 

PARD3 has been shown to interact with:
 JAM2, 
 JAM3, 
 PRKCI, and
 PVRL3.

References

Further reading